Love, Peace and Happiness is an album by soul artists The Chambers Brothers, released in 1969.

The album was released as a double-LP, half studio recordings and half live recordings. The live material was recorded at Bill Graham's Fillmore East.

In "Love, Peace and Happiness", the phrase "That's one small step for a man, a giant leap for mankind" is paraphrased as, "It's a small step for man, but it's a giant leap for all mankind". The song peaked at No. 96 on the Billboard Hot 100. It was covered by Carlos Santana and The Isley Brothers on 2017's Power of Peace.

Critical reception
AllMusic wrote that "the live sides are better, with stronger material, including 'I Can't Turn You Loose' and 'People Get Ready'." Robert Christgau, who had briefly attended the concert at which the live side was recorded, wrote that "now that the evidence is in I know I did the right thing," and called the album "shameful excess." 

Reviewing a 2016 reissue, the Lincolnshire Echo called the album "life-enhancing," and praised the "punchy live set."

Track listing

Studio
 "Have a Little Faith" (Sammy Turner) – 5:11
 "Let's Do It (Do It Together)" (Sammy Turner) – 4:33
 "To Love Somebody" (Robin Gibb, Barry Gibb, Maurice Gibb) – 4:36
 "If You Want Me To" (Sammy Turner) – 3:58
 "Wake Up" (Marvin Hamlisch, Joel Hirschhorn) – 2:17
 "Love, Peace and Happiness" (The Chambers Brothers) – 16:15

Live
 "Wade in the Water" (Traditional; arranged by Joseph Chambers) – 10:22
 "Everybody Needs Somebody" (Joseph Chambers) – 6:28
 "I Can't Turn You Loose" (Otis Redding) – 2:56
 "People Get Ready" (Curtis Mayfield) – 4:13
 "Bang Bang" (Joe Cuba, Jimmy Sabater) – 7:25
 "You're So Fine" (Willie Schofield, Lance Finney, Bob West)  – 4:38
 "Medley: Undecided/Love! Love! Love!" (Charlie Shavers, Sid Robin/Sidney J. Wyche, Teddy McRae, Sunny David) – 4:04

References

The Chambers Brothers albums
1968 live albums
Albums produced by Dave Rubinson
Columbia Records live albums
Live at the Fillmore East albums